Dan Neramit, sometimes translated as Magic Land, was the first amusement park in Thailand. It occupied  of land on Phahonyothin Road in Bangkok's Chatuchak District, and was in operation from 1976 to 2000, when its lease expired and owner Pannin Kitiparaporn moved operations to her new main property Dream World in the northern suburb of Pathum Thani Province.

One of the park's most distinctive features was its fairy-tale castle, which overlooked its relatively small plot of land, and still stands today. The park's grounds are now occupied by a go-kart racetrack.

References

Defunct amusement parks in Thailand
Tourist attractions in Bangkok
Chatuchak district
1976 establishments in Thailand
2000 disestablishments in Thailand